Rainin' in My Heart is an extended play 45 rpm record released by the English beat group Pretty Things in 1965.  The record reached # 12 in the British EP charts in October of that same year.

Track listing
Side one
 "Rainin' in My Heart" – (Jerry West, James Moore) – 2:31
 "London Town" (Dick Taylor) – 2:27

Side two
 "Sittin' All Alone" – (Dick Taylor, Ian Sterling, Phil May) – 3:01
 "Get a Buzz" – (Pretty Things) – 4:02

Personnel
Pretty Things
 Dick Taylor – lead guitar
 Phil May – lead vocals, harmonica
 Brian Pendleton – rhythm guitar, backing vocals on "Sittin' All Alone"
 John Stax – bass guitar, backing vocals on "Sittin' All Alone"
 Skip Alan, Bobby Graham – drums

References

1965 EPs
Pretty Things albums
Fontana Records EPs